Robert Joseph is a scholar and professor at Missouri State University.

Robert Joseph may also refer to:
Robert Joseph (wine connoisseur), British wine expert and writer
Robert L. Joseph (1923–2002), American theater playwright
Robbie Joseph (born 1982), West-Indian cricketer
Robert Joseph (basketball) (born 1979), Haitian basketball player